The Adventures of Rupert Bear (My Little Rupert in the US) was a live-action puppet television series, based on the Mary Tourtel character Rupert Bear, produced by ATV. It aired from 28 October 1970 to 24 August 1977 on the ITV network, with 156 11-minute episodes produced over four series. but would later enjoy regular repeat screenings until 1981

Production 
The characters were all puppets, although the opening sequence featured a toy version of Rupert Bear sitting in a live-action child's bedroom. Rupert's friends and flying chariot appeared just as they had in the pages of the Daily Express, although he was joined by some new friends, including a sprite called Willy Wisp. One of the most-remembered elements of the series was the theme song, which was written by Len Beadle and Ron Roker, sung by Jackie Lee, and reached No. 14 in the United Kingdom charts in 1971. The song includes the erroneous lyric "Rupert the Bear" (Rupert has never had the definite article in his name). The narrator of the stories was Judy Bennett.

Archival status 
Of the 156 episodes made, for many years only 75 were known to exist in their original colour film format, with a further 16 duplicated on black-and-white 16mm film. The remaining episodes were thought to be lost. On 21 April 2017, it was announced by the Network imprint that original film elements for all 156 episodes had been located, and were to be released on DVD in three volumes, with the first release comprising the earliest 52 episodes.

Characters 
Rupert Bear.
Mr. Bear.
Mrs. Bear.
Willy Wisp the Sprite.
Bill Badger.
Bobby Badger - Bill’s baby brother.
Podgy Pig.
Edward Trunk.
Pong-Ping.
George the Dragon.
P.C. Growler.
Margot.
Tiger Lily.
The Chinese Conjuror.
Sailor Sam.
Gypsy Granny.
Rosalie Pig - Podgy’s cousin.
Ting Ling - Tiger Lily’s cousin.
Raggety the Twig Troll.
Santa Claus.
Jack Frost.
The Snow Queen.
Simple Simon.
Mr. Grimnasty the Old Man of the Wood.
The Inventor.
The Professor.
The Wise Old Wizard.
Farmer Termott.
The Scarecrow.
The Crow.
Goosegog the Gooseberry Fool.
The Wizard of the Wind.
Drizzle - assistant to the Wizard of the Wind.
Mother Dragon.
Great-Grandfather Dragon.
Mary-Mary Quite Contrary.
Jack and Jill.
Mr. & Mrs. Weather the Weather People.
Bianco and Bianca the Cloud Children.

Episodes

Season 1 (1970)
 Rupert and the Flying Chariot.
 Rupert and Raggety.
 Rupert and the Unknown.
 Rupert and the Blue Fireworks.
 Rupert and the Fishing Rod.
 Rupert and the Snow Machine.
 Rupert at Rocky Bay.
 Rupert and the Christmas Toffee.
 Rupert and the Spring Chicken.
Rupert and Sky Boat.
Rupert and the Paper Fall.
Rupert and the Compass.
Rupert and the Butterflies.
Rupert and the Magic Ball.
Rupert and the Basket Rocket.
Rupert and the Green Buzzer.
Rupert and the Blue Moon.
Rupert in Mysteryland.
Rupert and Margot.
Rupert and the Snowman.
Rupert and the Train Journey.
Rupert and the Distant Music.
Rupert and the Cold Cure.
Rupert and the Ice Flowers.
Rupert and the Old Hat.
Rupert and the Inventor.

Season 2 (1971)
 Rupert and the Truant.
Rupert and the Autumn Primrose.
Rupert and the Baby Badger.
 Rupert and the Rope Ladder.
 Rupert and the Gooseberry Fool.
 Rupert and the Yellow Dog-Roses.
 Rupert and the Flying Saucer.
 Rupert and the Top Hat.
 Rupert and the Forest Fire.
Rupert and the Crackerjack.
Rupert and the Birthday Kettle.
Rupert and the Snuff Box.
Rupert and the Dragon Sweets.
Rupert and the Elephants.
Rupert and the Winter Woolies.
Rupert and the Sketch-Book.
Rupert and the Woffle Fly.
Rupert and the Lost Chariot.
Rupert and the Golden Acorn.
Rupert and the Balloon.
Rupert and the Spring Adventure.
Rupert and the Missing Pieces.
Rupert and the Outlaw.
Rupert and Unlucky Simon.
Rupert and Rusty.
Rupert and the Old Chimney.

Season 3 (1973)
 Rupert and the Salt Queen.
 Rupert and the Falling Star.
Rupert and the Piggy Bank.
 Rupert Gets a Message.
 Rupert and the Willow Patterned Plate.
 Rupert and the Moledigger.
 Rupert and the Witch’s Chariot.
 Rupert and the Dragon Feast.
 Rupert and the Scaredly Scarecrow.
Rupert, Raggety and the Bricks.
Rupert to the Rescue.
Rupert and the New Star.
Rupert and the One-Eyed Monster.
Rupert and the Christmas Stocking.
Rupert’s Christmas Party.
Rupert at the Pantomime.
Rupert and the Floating Water.
Rupert in Rhyme Land.
Rupert and the Magic Icicle.
Rupert and Great Aunt Emily.
Rupert and the Snow Guard.
Rupert and the Chinese Kite.
Rupert and the Wonderful Lamp.
Rupert and the Forgetful Flowers.
Rupert and the Thief.
Rupert in Cloud Land.
Rupert and the Goosegog Trap.
Rupert and the Treasure Hunt.
Rupert and the Jack-in-the-Box.
Rupert in Space.
Rupert and the Changing Weather.
Rupert and the Troublesome Tent.
Rupert and the Leaking Roof.
Rupert and the Jigsaw Puzzle.
Rupert and the Tightrope Walker.
Rupert and the Roses.
Rupert and the Poppies.
Rupert and the Time Zone.
Rupert and the Flying Sou’Wester.
Rupert and the Newspapers.
Rupert on the Farm.
Rupert and the Electronic Key.
Rupert and the Holiday Adventure.
Rupert and the Castaway.
Rupert and the Princess.
Rupert and Rosalie.
Rupert and the Air Smugglers.
Rupert and the Rainbow.
Rupert and the Pothole.
Rupert and the Seashell.
Rupert and the Experiment.
Rupert and the Pie Contest.

Season 4 (1974)
Rupert and the Cyclone.
Rupert and the Daffodil Telephone.
Rupert and the Singing Birdseed.
Rupert Turns Detective.
Rupert and the Computer.
Rupert Rescues Rosalie.
Rupert and the Hiccuping Dragon.
Rupert and the Upside-Down Tree.
Rupert and the Giant Pancake.
Rupert and the Sleepless Hedgehog.
Rupert and the Man in the Moon.
Rupert and the Red Mac.
Rupert and the Lonely Pillar Box.
Rupert and Nutwood Station.
Rupert and the Fancy Dress Party.
Rupert and the Sand Castle.
Rupert and the Eskimo.
Rupert and the Wool Gathering.
Rupert and the Golden Egg.
Rupert and the House That Never Was.
Rupert and the Snow Cloud.
Rupert and the Light Situation.
Rupert and the New Neighbours.
Rupert and the Buried Silver.
Rupert and the Shoemaker’s Son.
Rupert and the Unusual Portrait.
Rupert and Raggety’s Birthday.
Rupert and the Rope Trick.
Rupert and Red Riding Hood.
Rupert and the Crock of Gold.
Rupert and the Knight.
 Rupert and the Easter Parade.
Rupert and the New-Fangled Heater.
Rupert and the White Christmas.
Rupert and Little Jumping Joan.
Rupert Goes Shopping Twice.
Rupert and Mr. Grimnasty’s New Home.
Rupert and Tiger Lily.
Rupert and the White Rabbit.
Rupert and the Happy Families.
Rupert and the Old Coat.
Rupert and the Bedoozle Man.
Rupert  and the Helpful Time.
Rupert and the Profusion Plant-Grower.
Rupert and the Striped Digger.
Rupert and the Nutwood Fair.
Rupert and the Naughty Tinker.
Rupert and the Old Mill.
Rupert and the Good Deed.
Rupert and the Late Winter.
Rupert and the Professor’s Problem.
Rupert and Punch and Judy.

DVD release 
In April 2017, Network announced it would be releasing the first 52 episodes from the first two series on DVD (Region 2, PAL format). http://networkonair.com/exclusives/2626-adventures-of-rupert-bear-the-volume-1

The set was made available only directly through Network's website.

A second volume containing the 52 episodes from series 3 was released soon afterward, again exclusive to the Network DVD website and in the same format. http://networkonair.com/exclusives/2686-adventures-of-rupert-bear-the-volume-2

Later, a third volume containing all 52 episodes from series 4 was released, once again exclusive to the Network DVD website and in the same format as the other volumes. http://networkonair.com/all-products/2715-adventures-of-rupert-bear-the-volume-3

All four series were later released as a complete set in October 2017, available from all major retailers.

References

External links

 
 Little Gems - The Adventures of Rupert Bear stills
 Toonhound -- Rupert Bear
 

1969 British television series debuts
1977 British television series endings
1960s British children's television series
1970s British children's television series
ITV children's television shows
Rupert Bear
Television shows based on comic strips
British television shows featuring puppetry
Television series by ITC Entertainment
Television series by ITV Studios
Television series about bears